A lick is a small watercourse or an ephemeral stream. It ranks hydrologically between a rill and a stream.

Geomorphology